This article lists artworks produced by Dale Chihuly (born September 20, 1941), an American glass sculptor and entrepreneur who works with blown glass.

Permanent collections 
Permanent collections that include work by Dale Chihuly.

United States 

Alabama
Amber Luster Chandelier, Jule Collins Smith Museum of Fine Art, Auburn University, Auburn, 2003
Birmingham Persian Wall, Birmingham Museum of Art, Birmingham, 1995
Arizona
The Desert Towers, Desert Botanical Garden, Phoenix, 2008
California
Blue Jules, Founders Hall Art Gallery, Soka University of America, Aliso Viejo, 2001
Nuutajarvi Turquoise Chandelier, San Jose Chandelier-Cadmium Yellow, San Jose Chandelier- Cadmium Red San Jose Museum of Art, San Jose, 1995
Sobrato Chandelier, Sobrato Office Tower, 488 S. Almaden Boulevard, San Jose, 2003
Colorado
Colorado Springs Fine Arts Center, Colorado Springs, 2004
"Colorado", Denver Botanic Gardens, Denver, 2015
Connecticut
"Ode to Joy", Bushnell Center for the Performing Arts, Hartford, 
"River Blue", Mohegan Sun Casino, Uncasville,
Delaware
Persian Window, Delaware Art Museum, Wilmington, 1999, expanded in 2005
Florida
Lowe Art Museum at the University of Miami, Coral Gables
Chihuly Collection, includes Ruby Red Icicle Chandelier, Morean Arts Center, St. Petersburg
Persian Sealife Ceiling, Norton Museum of Art, West Palm Beach, 2003
Cobalt and Citron Tower, on a 10-year loan to the museum, Orlando Museum of Art Orlando, 2004
Boca Raton Museum of Art, Boca Raton
Red Chandelier, Icicle Chandelier, and Persian Ceiling, The Baker Museum (formerly the Naples Museum of Art), Naples
Georgia
Isola di San Giacomo in Palude, Columbus Museum, Columbus, 1996
Chandeliers, Scheller College of Business, Atlanta, 2008
 Hawaii
Persians Yellow and Cobalt Wall Piece, Honolulu Museum of Art, Honolulu, 1992
Reef, Honolulu Museum of Art, Honolulu, 2001
Illinois
Persian Wall, Schaumburg Township District Library Main Branch, Schaumburg
Persian Pool, Garfield Park Conservatory, Chicago, 2002
Indiana
Yellow Chandelier and Persians, Columbus Area Visitors Center, Columbus, 1995
DNA Tower on the campus of Indiana University – Purdue University Indianapolis, Indianapolis, 2003
Fireworks of Glass Tower and Ceiling, The Children's Museum of Indianapolis, Indianapolis, 2006
Sun Garden Panels in Suspended Circle, Indiana University-Purdue University Columbus Learning Center, Columbus, 2007
Kansas
"Chandalier" Kansas State University, Beach Museum of Art acquired in 1996
Persian Seaform Ceiling, Wichita Art Museum, Wichita, 2003
Kentucky
The Spirit of the Maker, Maker's Mark Distillery, Loretto, 2014
Massachusetts
Lime Green Icicle Tower, Museum of Fine Arts, Boston, 2011
Clear and Gold Tower, Mount Holyoke College Art Museum, South Hadley, 2013
 Michigan
Cobalt Blue Persian Set with Cadmium Red Lip Wraps, Muskegon Museum of Art, 1972
Kalamazoo Ruby Light Chandelier, Kalamazoo Institute of Arts, Kalamazoo, 1998
Beacon Gold Chandelier, Krasl Art Center, St. Joseph, 2000
Flint Institute of Arts Persian Chandelier, Flint Institute of Arts, Flint, 2009
Gilded Champagne Gardens Chandelier, Frederik Meijer Gardens & Sculpture Park, Grand Rapids, 2003
Life, Van Andel Institute, Grand Rapids, 2005 
Lena’s Garden, Frederik Meijer Gardens & Sculpture Park, Grand Rapids, 2009
 Minnesota
Cafesjian Chandelier, Cafesjian Art Trust Museum, Shoreview, 1994
Pergola Ceiling, Cafesjian Art Trust Museum, Shoreview, 1999
Sunburst, Minneapolis Institute of Arts, Minneapolis, 1999
Silver Tiger Print Basket Set with Orange Lip Wraps, Minneapolis Institute of Art, Minneapolis, 1995
Clear and Silver Chandelier, Kathryn A. Martin Library, University of Minnesota - Duluth, Duluth, 2000
Mayo Clinic, Rochester, 2001
 Missouri
Kemper Museum of Contemporary Art Persian Wall, Kemper Museum of Contemporary Art, Kansas City, 1996
Campiello del Remer, Ireland, Kemper Museum of Contemporary Art, Kansas City, 1996
 1996: Palazzo di Loredana Balboni, Kemper Museum of Contemporary Art, Kansas City
Wine Chandelier, St. Louis Art Museum, St. Louis, 1996
Missouri Botanical Garden Blue Chandelier, Missouri Botanical Garden, St. Louis, 2007
 Nebraska
Chihuly: Inside & Out Joslyn Art Museum, Omaha, 2000
Toreador Red, Peter Kiewit Institute at the University of Nebraska, Omaha, 2000
Glowing Gemstone Polyvitro Chandelier, Joslyn Art Museum, Omaha, 2004
Chihuly Sanctuary, Fred & Pamela Buffett Cancer Center, University of Nebraska Medical Center, Omaha, 2017
 Nevada
Fiori di Como, Bellagio Hotel and Casino, Paradise, 1998
Nevada Cancer Institute, Summerlin, 2004
Chihuly at CityCenter, The Gallery at CityCenter, CityCenter, Paradise, 2009
New Jersey
Borgata Hotel, Casino & Spa, Atlantic City, 2003
 New Mexico
UWC-USA, Montezuma
 The Spencer Collection, The Spencer Theater, Alto
 New York
Rainbow Room Frieze, Rockefeller Center, New York City, 1987
Persian Window, St. Peter's Church, New York City, 1994
Fern Green Tower, Corning Museum of Glass, Corning, 1999
Glass Garden and Chandelier, Mandarin Oriental New York, New York City, 2003
 Blue and Gold Chandelier, Eastman School of Music, Rochester, 2010
 Ohio
Chihuly Collection Franklin Park Conservatory, Columbus, 2003
Gilded Silver and Aquamarine Chandelier, Storer Music Hall, Kenyon College, Gambier, 2003
The University of Akron, Akron, 2005
Campiello del Remer #2, Toledo Museum of Art, Toledo, 2006
University Hospitals Ahuja Medical Center, Beachwood, 2010
 Oklahoma
Oklahoma City Museum of Art, Oklahoma City, 2002
 Oregon
Gilded & Ethereal Blue Chandelier, Global Aviation, Hillsboro Airport, Hillsboro, 2000
 Pennsylvania
 Phipps Conservatory & Botanical Gardens, Pittsburgh, 2008
Flame of Liberty, National Liberty Museum, Philadelphia, 2000
Dappled Chalk Violet Ikebana with Fuchsia Frog Foot, Reading Public Museum, Reading, 2002
Fountain Spray, Reading Public Museum, Reading, 2005
 South Carolina
 Untitled, Columbia Museum of Art, Columbia, 2009-2010
 Tennessee
 Indigo Seaform Set with Red Lip Wraps, Eskind Biomedical Library, Vanderbilt University, Nashville, 1998
 Texas
Hart Window, Dallas Museum of Art, Dallas, 1995
Southwestern Seay Tower, UT Southwestern Medical Sarah and Charles Seay Biomedical Building, Dallas, 2000
Persian Ceiling, San Antonio Museum of Art, San Antonio, 2003
Fiesta Tower, San Antonio Public Library, San Antonio, 2005
 Utah
Olympic Tower, Abravanel Hall, Salt Lake City, 2002
 Virginia
Mille Colori, Virginia Museum of Contemporary Art, Virginia Beach, 2003
 Washington
Frank Russell Company, Tacoma, 1988
Flower Form 2, City Centre shopping area, U.S. Bank Centre, Seattle, 1989
Washington State Convention Center, Seattle, 1992-1993
Union Station (Tacoma, Washington), Union Station (Tacoma, Washington), Tacoma
Gonzaga Red Chandelier, Jundt Art Museum at Gonzaga University, Spokane, 1995
Rose Window, Pacific Lutheran University, Tacoma, 1995
Microsoft Corporation, Redmond, 1995
Icicle Creek Chandelier, Icicle Creek Sleeping Lady Conference Retreat, Leavenworth, 1996
Crystal Cascade, Benaroya Hall, Seattle, 1998
Chihuly Window, University of Puget Sound, Tacoma, 2000
Bridge of Glass, Bridge of Glass, Museum of Glass, Tacoma, 2002
 Chihuly: Gifts from the Artist, Tacoma Art Museum, Tacoma, 2003
End of Day Chandelier, Lincoln Square, Bellevue, 2006
Chihuly Garden and Glass, Seattle, 2012
 West Virginia
 The Huntington Museum of Art Tower, The C. Fred Edwards Tropical Plant Conservatory Huntington Museum of Art, Huntington
 Wisconsin
 Mendota Wall, Kohl Center, University of Wisconsin–Madison, 1998
 Johnson Family Chandelier, Johnson Building Racine, 2002
 Weidner Center Chandelier, Weidner Center, University of Wisconsin–Green Bay, 2004

Canada 
Ontario
Soho Metropolitan - 318 Wellington St Toronto, 2003
Alberta
Winter Garden - Jamieson Place, Calgary, 2009
British Columbia
1200 Georgia Street, Vancouver, 1998
Quebec
Hilton Lac-Leamy, Gatineau, 2001
The Montreal Museum of Fine Arts, Montreal, announced a fundraising campaign to purchase The Sun in 2013.

England 
V&A Rotunda Chandelier, Victoria and Albert Museum, London, 1999, expanded in 2001

Singapore 
Resorts World Sentosa, Sentosa, Singapore, 2010
 Duplicate of the V&A Rotunda Chandelier, Scotts Square, Singapore.
Chihuly Lounge, The Ritz-Carlton Millenia Singapore

United Arab Emirates 
Atlantis, The Palm, Dubai, United Arab Emirates, 2008

Kuwait
360 Mall, Kuwait

References

External links 
 
 Chihuly Garden And Glass exhibition